New Haven Unified School District (also known as NHUSD) is a public school district serving approximately 11,000 kindergarten through 12th-grade (K-12) students at 11 schools in Union City and South Hayward, in the San Francisco Bay Area.

The district was formed in 1965 from elementary school districts in Union City, and from the Union High School District in Fremont. New Haven was an early settlement on the west side of present-day Union City. New Haven became part of Alvarado, which maintained its name for more than 100 years until Union City was formed in the late 1950s. The New Haven School District was founded and took its name from the old settlement. Since Union City incorporated, its name is also part of the district's logo, which shows a group of children from all races and backgrounds holding hands around the city.

Schools
The New Haven Unified School District (NHUSD) is represented by five publicly elected trustees. Each trustee represents  areas in Union City and 
South Hayward .New Haven School district will be switching to district elections on November 3, 2020.

Elementary schools
Grades K–5
Alvarado Elementary School
Eastin Elementary School
Emanuele Elementary School
Hillview Crest Elementary School
Kitayama Elementary School
Pioneer Elementary School
Searles Elementary School

Middle schools
Grades 6–8

César Chávez Middle School
Itliong-Vera Cruz Middle School

High schools
Grades 9–12
Conley-Caraballo High School (continuation high school)
James Logan High School

Other Schools
Decoto School for Independent Study
New Haven Adult School

Strikes and incidents

2019 strike 
On May 19, 2019, the New Haven Teachers’ Association announced the beginning of a strike May 20, 2019.

Shooting
On November 20, 2019, two boys aged 11 and 14-years-old were shot in the parking lot of Searles Elementary School around 1 am, while sitting in a minivan. Both boys died of their wounds, one at the scene and the other at the hospital. The two were not known to be enrolled in the school. 18-year-old year Jason Cornejo of Castro Valley and a 17-year-old juvenile from Hayward were arrested on February 14, 2020. The first two arrested had gang affiliations, and it was suspected they thought the victims had ties with a rival gang.

References

External links
 

School districts in Alameda County, California
Union City, California
Education in Alameda County, California
1965 establishments in California
School districts established in 1965